Lenovo 3000 was a line of low-priced notebook and desktop computers designed by Lenovo Group targeting small businesses and individuals. It was replaced with the IdeaCentre and IdeaPad brands.

Background
The Lenovo 3000 series marked the debut of Lenovo branded products outside of China. First showcased in New York City on 23 February 2006, the line was intended to boost Lenovo's competitiveness internationally against rival brands like Dell and Hewlett-Packard. In addition, the 3000 series gave the company an independent identity: an identity separate from the Thinkpad line that Lenovo acquired in 2005 and defined its Westernised image since the acquisition.

In 2008, after introducing two new consumer brands, IdeaPad for laptops and IdeaCentre for desktops, Lenovo stopped selling its 3000 series models.

Models

Desktops

Lenovo 3000 J
features both AMD and Intel processors
Lenovo 3000 H

Notebooks
First introduced in 2006, the Lenovo 3000 N100 and V100 offered Intel Core Duo processors, while the lower-end C series featured Pentium M and Celeron M processors. Its successors, C200, N200, V200 featured Core 2 Duo processors. Thereafter, came the N500, the G-series, and the B series

Lenovo 3000 C
C100, C200 - 15-inch XGA screen
Lenovo 3000 N
N100, N200 - 14.1-inch- and 15.4-inch- WXGA models
N500 - 15.4 inch screen.
Lenovo 3000 V
V100, V200 - 12.1-inch WXGA models

Lenovo 3000 G
G400, G410, G430, G450, G455, G510, G530, G550, and G560

Lenovo 3000 B Series

B450-B490 - 15.4 inch screen

References

External links
 Introducing Lenovo 3000, Lenovo Group

3000
Consumer electronics brands
Discontinued products
Computer-related introductions in 2006